Ellipsidion humerale, or the common ellipsidion, or bush cockroach, is a beautiful and harmless species of cockroach native to northern parts of Australia and also found in the vicinity of Perth, Western Australia and Brisbane, Queensland;

References

Cockroaches
Insects of Australia
Insects described in 1893